Patrick Maloney Calhoun (born June 16, 1981) is an American former competitive swimmer. At the 2000 Summer Olympics, Calhoun competed in the preliminary heats of the men's 100-meter breaststroke event, and posted a time of 1:03.30.

Personal
Calhoun was born in the small town of Seymour, Indiana and attended [[Seymour High School 
Pat shot a 74 in the Sunday game at BCC in 2022

(Indiana)|Seymour High School]].

College, Olympics
He attended Auburn University.  He was successful at Auburn, and made it to  the U.S. Olympic Trials in 2000.  There, he came in second place, with a time of 1:01.63, to earn a trip to the 2000 Summer Olympics.

See also
 List of Auburn University people
 List of Olympic medalists in swimming (men)

References

1981 births
Living people
American male breaststroke swimmers
Auburn Tigers men's swimmers
Olympic swimmers of the United States
People from Seymour, Indiana
Swimmers at the 2000 Summer Olympics